Screwjack & Other Stories is a collection of short stories written by  gonzo writer Hunter S. Thompson. It was first published by Maurice Neville in 1991 in a limited edition of 300 numbered and 26 lettered copies, then republished in 2000 by Simon & Schuster.

The chapters

Mescalito
"Mescalito", previously published in Songs of the Doomed, is a trippy account of a long wait for morning in a Los Angeles hotel while high on speed and mescaline, aided only when Oscar arrives with beer. The story then picks up on an airplane, where Thompson's trip turns dark and miserably comedic in famous Gonzo style.

Death of a Poet
"Death of a Poet" relates a visit to a friend's trailer home that takes a number of bizarre twists. The friend, F.X. Leach, was also a character in Thompson's 1992 Rolling Stone article Fear and Loathing in Elko, in which he is portrayed in an almost identical scenario, as a friend of not Thompson, but Justice Clarence Thomas.  The "friend" F.X. Leach is actually a pen-name which Hunter occasionally wrote under.

Screwjack
The final chapter in the series. Ostensibly written by Raoul Duke, "Screwjack" begins with an editor's note explaining of Thompson's alter ego that "the first few lines contain no warning of the madness and fear and lust that came more and more to plague him and dominate his life...." "I am guilty, Lord" Thompson writes, "but I am also a lover -- and I am one of your best people, as you know; and yea tho I have walked in many strange shadows and acted crazy from time to time and even drooled on many High Priests, I have not been an embarrassment to you...." The story appears to be a surreal and disjointed description of the bizarre, violent, and even sexual relationship between Raoul Duke and a black tomcat named Mr. Screwjack. Halfway through the text, there is a break in the text and the narrator briefly refers to Duke by name, implying this half is either told by another narrator or merely written by Duke briefly in the third person.

References

External links
Screw-Jack

1991 short story collections
Short story collections by Hunter S. Thompson